is a railway station located in Sasebo, Nagasaki Prefecture, Japan. It is operated by JR Kyushu and is the junction of the Sasebo and Ōmura Lines.

Lines
There is no through track. Trains stopping at the station execute a switchback before continuing their journey towards either termini of the line. The station is also the starting point of the Ōmura Line although most of the local trains on the line continue their journey to end at Sasebo using the Sasebo Line track. Besides the local services on the Sasebo Line, the following rapid and limited express services also stop at the station:

Station layout 
The station consists of a side and an island platform serving four tracks. Track/platform 1 is a dead-end siding and juts into the other side of platform 2. It is used as by trains on the Sasebo Line to perform a switchback to continue their journey after stopping at the station as there is no through-track. Track 3 is a through-track for Sasebo Line towards the Ōmura Line while tracks 4/5 are served by platforms 4 and 5, the island platform. The station building is a hashigami structure where station facilities are located on a bridge spanning the tracks, with entrances on both the east and west side of the tracks.  On the bridge structure are located a waiting area, a kiosk, and a staffed ticket window with a Midori no Madoguchi facility. Elevators lead up from the station entrances to the bridge and from the bridge to the platforms. Parking for cars is provided at both the west and east entrances of the station and there is a designated parking area for bicycles.

To the east of the station are multiple sidings and a turntable belonging to the maintenance depot or "driving centre" of the Nagasaki branch of JR Kyushu.

Adjacent stations 

|-
|colspan=5 style="text-align:center;" |Kyūshū Railway Company

History
In the next phase of expansion, the track was extended further west with Haiki opening as the new western terminus on 10 July 1897. By 20 January 1898, Haiki became a through-station when the track was extended to  while another branch had reached Ōmura and then on 27 November that year,  and by 5 April 1905, Nagasaki. When the Kyushu Railway was nationalized on 1 July 1907, Japanese Government Railways (JGR) took over control of the station. On 12 October 1909, track from Tosu through Haiki to Nagasaki was designated the Nagasaki Main Line while the branch from to Sasebo was designated the Sasebo Line with Haiki as the official starting point. The track from Haiki to Isahaya was designated the Ōmura Line. With the privatization of Japanese National Railways (JNR), the successor of JGR, on 1 April 1987, control of the station passed to JR Kyushu.

On 11 October 2014, a hashigami-format station building was opened, replacing the old station building, a historic timber structure in western style which was built in 1897.

Passenger statistics
In fiscal 2016, the station was used by an average of 1,646 passengers daily (boarding passengers only), and it ranked 108th among the busiest stations of JR Kyushu.

See also
 List of railway stations in Japan

References

External links
Haiki Station (JR Kyushu)

Railway stations in Nagasaki Prefecture
Railway stations in Japan opened in 1897
Ōmura Line
Sasebo